Charles Broad (23 September 1828 – 12 November 1879) was a New Zealand goldfields administrator and magistrate. He was born in London, England on 23 September 1828. He was an uncle to Charles Harrington Broad.

References

1828 births
1879 deaths
District Court of New Zealand judges
English emigrants to New Zealand
Colony of New Zealand judges